At the Moulin Rouge is an oil-on-canvas painting by French artist Henri de Toulouse-Lautrec.  It was painted between 1892 and 1895.  Included in the background is a self-portrait of the artist in profile.  It is one of a number of works by Toulouse-Lautrec depicting the Moulin Rouge cabaret built in Paris in 1889.  

The painting portrays near its center a group of three men and two women sitting around a table situated on the floor of the cabaret. From right to left, the people at the table include: writer Édouard Dujardin, dancer La Macarona, photographer Paul Secau, photographer Maurice Guibert, and, facing away, Jane Avril, being the focal point of the group - recognizable by her flaming red-orange hair. In the right foreground, apparently sitting at a different table, is a partial facial view of English dancer May Milton, with painted red lips, her face aglow in a distinctive greenish light and shadow.  In the background standing on the right fixing her hair is Moulin Rouge dancer La Goulue and another woman. The center-left background shows the short-statured Toulouse-Lautrec himself, standing in front of and next to, Dr. Gabriel Tapié de Céleyran.

At the Moulin Rouge is  part of the Helen Birch Bartlett Memorial Collection at the Art Institute of Chicago, where it was first displayed on December 23, 1930. It was exhibited in London in 2011 at the Courtauld Institute of Art. Art critic Jonathan Jones calls the painting a masterpiece, and writes "the scene is somehow more exotic and more exciting than any recreation [of the Moulin Rouge, or Montmartre] in popular culture."

References

Paintings by Henri de Toulouse-Lautrec
Post-impressionist paintings
1892 paintings
Paintings in the collection of the Art Institute of Chicago
Works set in the Moulin Rouge
Paintings set in cabarets
Food and drink paintings
Paintings of Montmartre